1966 in philosophy

Events 
Heidegger's interview with Der Spiegel under the title Only a God Can Save Us (published in 1976)

Publications 
 Michael Polanyi, The Tacit Dimension (1966)
 Kenneth Burke, Language As Symbolic Action (1966)
 Theodor W. Adorno, Negative Dialectics (1966)
 Michel Foucault, The Order of Things (1966)
 Louis Dumont, Homo Hierarchicus (1966)
 Mary Douglas, Purity and Danger (1966)
 Peter L. Berger and Thomas Luckmann, The Social Construction of Reality (1966)
 Susan Sontag, Against Interpretation (1966)
 Alasdair MacIntyre, A Short History of Ethics (1966)

Births 
 February 23 - Paul Bakker, controversial Dutch professor of medieval and renaissance philosophy
 April 20 - David Chalmers

Deaths 
 July 12 - D. T. Suzuki (born 1870)

References 

 
Philosophy
20th-century philosophy
Philosophy by year